Baiera is a genus of prehistoric gymnosperms in the order Ginkgoales. It is one of the oldest fossil foliage types of Ginkgoales, and is related to the genera Ginkgo and Ginkgoites. Fossils of Baiera are found worldwide, and have been known from the Permian to the Cretaceous.

Description 

Baiera species are characterized by fan-shaped leaves, are deeply lobed into four segments, deeply incised into slender segments, and are distinguished from Sphenobaiera by a petiole.

B. africana is characterized by its symmetrical and triangular leaves.

Classification 
Karl Friedrich Wilhelm Braun first introduced the name Baiera in 1843 to refer to fossils in Germany that he interpreted as ginkgophytes. In 1936, Carl Rudolf Florin used Baiera to refer to leaves with a distinct stalk or petiole and with a semicircular or triangular shape.

Placement of Baiera 
Gerd Dietl and Günter Schweigert (2011) place Baiera in the family Ginkgoaceae, while a 2015 classification by Andriy Novikoff and Beata Barabasz-Krasny places it in the Karkeniaceae.

References 

Ginkgophyta
Prehistoric gymnosperm genera